Kristy McPherson (born May 28, 1981) is an American  professional golfer, currently playing on the LPGA Tour.

Early life and amateur career
A native of South Carolina, McPherson was diagnosed with Still's disease at age 11, which is a form of juvenile idiopathic arthritis. Confined mostly to bed and unable to walk for a year, she was told she would no longer be able to compete in any sport that required jumping or running. As a result, she took up golf and played on the boys' golf team at her high school. She earned a golf scholarship to the University of South Carolina, and recorded seven victories in her four-year collegiate career. McPherson graduated in 2003 with a bachelor's degree in Sports and Entertainment Management. In 2003, McPherson was awarded the Honda Inspiration Award which is given to a collegiate athlete "who has overcome hardship and was able to return to play at the collegiate level". She overcame Stills Disease, and rebounded to become an accomplished golfer.

The Big Break
While on the Futures Tour, McPherson appeared on the Golf Channel reality show The Big Break VI, which was filmed during a two-week period in late June and early July 2006. McPherson was the fifth player eliminated from the show.

Professional career
After graduating from college, McPherson turned professional and competed on the Futures Tour for four years. From 2003 to 2006 she competed in 60 events, never missed a cut, and won twice.  Her fourth-place finish on the Futures Tour money list in 2006 earned her an LPGA Tour card for the 2007 season.

Her first season on the LPGA brought limited success, with a best finish a tie for 18th; she finished the season 97th on the money list.  In 2008, her second year, she recorded six top-10 finishes, and finished 47th on the official money list.  In 2009, McPherson recorded a T-2 in a LPGA major, the Kraft Nabisco Championship, followed by a T-5 three months later at the next major, the LPGA Championship.

Professional wins (2)

Futures Tour (2)

Results in LPGA majors
Results not in chronological order before 2019.

^ The Evian Championship was added as a major in 2013.

CUT = missed the half-way cut
NT = no tournament
T = tied

Summary

Most consecutive cuts made – 7 (2008 LPGA – 2010 Kraft Nabisco)
Longest streak of top-10s – 2 (2009 Kraft Nabisco – 2009 LPGA)

LPGA Tour career summary

 official through the 2022 season

Symetra Tour summary

Team appearances
Professional
Solheim Cup (representing the United States): 2009 (winners)

References

External links

Kristy McPherson at golf.about.com 

American female golfers
LPGA Tour golfers
Solheim Cup competitors for the United States
Golfers from South Carolina
Golfers from Tampa, Florida
South Carolina Gamecocks women's golfers
People from Conway, South Carolina
1981 births
Living people